Chen Ying (born November 4, 1977 in Beijing) is a female Chinese sports shooter who won the gold medal at the 2008 Summer Olympics and at the 2006 ISSF World Shooting Championships in 25 m Pistol.

In the 2004 Summer Olympics she finished fourth in the women's 25 metre pistol competition.

She won silver medal in the women's 25 meter air pistol at the 2012 Summer Olympics.

References

External links
 

1977 births
Living people
Chinese female sport shooters
ISSF pistol shooters
Olympic gold medalists for China
Olympic silver medalists for China
Olympic shooters of China
Sport shooters from Beijing
Shooters at the 2004 Summer Olympics
Shooters at the 2008 Summer Olympics
Shooters at the 2012 Summer Olympics
Shooters at the 2016 Summer Olympics
Olympic medalists in shooting
Asian Games medalists in shooting
Medalists at the 2012 Summer Olympics
Medalists at the 2008 Summer Olympics
Shooters at the 2002 Asian Games
Shooters at the 2006 Asian Games
Shooters at the 2014 Asian Games
Asian Games gold medalists for China
Asian Games silver medalists for China
Medalists at the 2002 Asian Games
Medalists at the 2006 Asian Games
Medalists at the 2014 Asian Games
21st-century Chinese women